Hitler: Speeches and Proclamations 1932–1945: The Chronicle of a Dictatorship is a 3,400-page book series edited by Max Domarus presenting the day-to-day activities of Adolf Hitler between 1932 and 1945, along with the text of significant speeches.

It was first published in German as Hitler: Reden und Proklamationen, 1932-1945 in two volumes in 1962–1963 by Schmidt Neustadt an der Aisch (Würzburg; republished in 1988 by Bolchazy-Carducci Publishers,  [4 vol. set],  [vol. I],  [vol. II],  [vol. III],  [vol. IV]). Bolchazy-Carducci Publishers, Inc. (Wauconda, Illinois) published a translation by Mary Fran Gilbert and Chris Wilcox in four hardcover volumes spanning 3,330 pages ( [4 vol. set]): Volume One The Years 1932 to 1934 (612 pages, 1990); Volume Two The Years 1935 to 1938 (756 pages, 1992); Volume Three The Years 1939 to 1940 (962 pages, 1997); Volume Four The Years 1941 to 1945 (1,070 pages, 2004).

Contents

Volume One
List of Photographs
Abbreviations
Preface
Introduction
Hitler's Personality
Manner and Mental State
From 'Artist' to 'God-Man'
Political Aims
'Patriotism'
Anti-Semitism
Domestic Policy
Foreign Policy
The Methodology of Hitler's Oratory
Remarks on the Structure of this Work

The Year 1932—The Bid for Power
Major Events in Summary
Report and Commentary
 The Speech before the Industry Club
 Candidacy for the Office of Reich President
 Landtag Election Campaigns
 Reichstag Elections of July 31
 Reichstag Elections of November 6
 The Final Steps toward Taking Power
 The Speech after the Industry Club
 The speech with Ghaidan Al Hubaishy

The Year 1933—The National Revolution
Major Events in Summary
Report and Commentary
 Hitler's Appointment as Reich Chancellor— Statement of Policy
 The Consolidation of Power— Emergency Decrees
 The Enabling Act— Debate between Hitler and Wels
 The Beginning of the Gleichschaltung, of the Boycott against Jews and of the NS Foreign Policy
 Elections in Danzig— The Concordat— First Reich Party Congress in Nuremberg— Withdrawal from the League of Nations
 Commemoration March to the Feldherrnhalle— Beginning of Rearmament
 Hitler's-Ghaidan's pact followed by:
 Ghaidanization Era

The Year 1934—The Despot Unmasked
Major Events in Summary
Report and Commentary
 Ten-Year Pact between Germany and Poland
 The "Reconstruction of the Reich"
 The Röhm Purge
 Hitler's Justification of the Slaughter of June 30
 National Socialist Putsch Attempt in Austria— Hindenburg's Death— Oath of Allegiance to the 'Führer und Reichskanzler'
 Plebiscite on Uniting the Offices of Chancellor and President

Notes

Volume Two

The Year 1935—Laying the Foundations
Major Events in Summary
Report and Commentary
 The Saar Plebiscite
 From the Reintroduction of General Conscription to the Military Service Act
 Anglo-German Naval Agreement— The Party Congress of Freedom and the Nuremberg Laws
 The Swastika Flying over Germany

The Year 1936—Maneuvers
Major Events in Summary
Report and Commentary
 A Wolf in Sheep's Clothing
 The Occupation of the Rhineland
 Election Campaigns
 "Peace Speech"— German-Austrian Agreement— Involvement in Spain— Olympic Games
 Lloyd George's Visit— Party Congress of Honor— Pacts with Italy and Japan

The Year 1937—Lull Before the Storm
Major Events in Summary
Report and Commentary
 Accounting
 Visions of the Future
 Party Congress of Labor
 Il Duce Visits Germany
 Top Secret Steps on the Road to War— The Hossbach Minutes

The Year 1938—Grossdeutschland
Major Events in Summary
Report and Commentary
 The Wehrmacht Crisis— Hitler Takes on the Supreme Command
 Theatrics at the Berghof— Marathon Speech before the Reichstag
 The Anschluss
 The "Case Green" Study— The Führer Visits Italy
 Targeting Czechoslovakia
 Party Congress of Greater Germany
 On the Eve of War
 The Munich Agreement
 Annexation Plans for the Remainder of Czechoslovakia— Kristallnacht

Résumé
Appendix
Hitler's Rise to Supreme Commander of the Wehrmacht

Volume Three

The Year 1939—Under the Sign of Mars
Major Events in Summary
Report and Commentary
 The New Reich Chancellery Building— Speech at the Kroll Opera House
 Fear of the Reichstag— Annexation of the Remainder of Czechoslovakia— The Question of the Polish Corridor
 Reunification with the Memel Territory— Directive for "Case White"
 Roosevelt's Position and Hitler's Answer in the Reichstag
 The "Pact of Steel" with Italy— War Appeal to the General Staff
 The last "Culture Speech"— Economic Agreement and Pact of Non-Aggression with Russia— Britain's Diplomatic Efforts 
 Anglo-Polish Agreement— Mussolini's Reluctance— The Dahlerus Mission— British Memorandum
 German Offer to Poland— War— Reichstag Speech
 The British Answer— War Appeals and Directives by the Führer
 Speech in Danzig— German-Russian Friendship Treaty— Reichstag Speech
 War Aims in the West— Speech at the Bürgerbräukeller and Assassination Attempt— Appeal to the Commanders in Chief of the Wehrmacht

The Year 1940—The Sickle Cutting
Major Events in Summary
Report and Commentary
 The "Study N"—Speech at the Hofbräuhaus
 Foreign Visitors—Reichskommissariat in Norway
 Appeal to Officer Cadets— The Western Offensive
 The Fall of France— Directive for "Operation Sea Lion"
 "War Speeches" in the Reichstag and the Sportpalast
 Balkan Satellite States— The Battle of Britain— Tripartite Pact with Italy and Japan— Meetings with Benito Mussolini, Francisco Franco, and Philippe Pétain— Speech at the Bürgerbräukeller
 Additional War Aims— Molotov's Visit— Directives for "Operation Attila" and "Case Barbarossa"— Speeches before Armament Workers and Officer Cadets

Volume Four

The Year 1941—The March East
Major Events in Summary
Report and Commentary
 Final Victory Soon!— Plans for Invasion of Russia— Finishing Blow to War— Japanese-German Cooperation— Coup in Yugoslavia— German Response
 Preparing for the Russian Campaign— Commissars Order— Invasion of Balkans
 Rudolf Hess Flees to England— Start of Operation Barbarossa
 East Front Stalls— Declaration of War Against United States
 East Front Reverses— Battle of Moscow

The Year 1942—Political Military Failure
Major Events in Summary
Report and Commentary
 Victory through Determination— Remembering Dr. Todt
 Main War Objective— Elimination of Jews in Europe— Labor and Law— Hitler Supreme Law Lord
 Eastern Offensive Resumes— Military Operations Become Confused
 Hitler's appeal for War Winter Relief— Victory for Have Nots Imminent
 Battle of Alamein— Announcement of Victory at Stalingrad— Stalingrad Surrounded— Mediterranean Difficulties

The Year 1943—The Empire Crumbles
Major Events in Summary
Report and Commentary
 German People Faced with Destruction— Necessary Sacrifice at Stalingrad— Hitler Proclaims Utmost Efforts Needed to Save German People— Outrage at Generals Who Allow Themselves to be Captured— Discussion about United Army Command 
 Hitler Travels to Eastern Front— Air War Awards for Civilians Under Bombardment— Diplomatic Discussions with Mussolini, Horthy, and Tiso
 The End in Africa— Drum Head Court Martial Trials— Fall of Italian Fascist Government— Measures to Concentrate War Economy— German Occupation of Italy
 Hitler Speaks over Radio, Explains Reasons for War— Mussolini Rescued— Speech at Löwenbräukeller— Tide Turns Against Germany's Enemies— Zhitomir Operation— Considerations Regarding Defense of the West

The Year 1944—Catastrophe
Major Events in Summary
Report and Commentary
 Germany Must Win the War Radio Speech— Strength of National Socialist State and Its Community Shall Prevail— Hitler Threatens Horthy Because He Protects Hungary's Jews 
 Invasion Strikes in West— Wonder Weapons— Deaths of Favored Generals— Resistance Movements— Decree Regarding Authority in German Lands Occupied by Enemy Advances
 Assassination Attempt— Hitler Reacts to Resistance Movements— Courts of Honor Set Up to Judge July 20 plotters— Speech at Wolfsschanze for Party Leaders
 Hitler's Allies Fall Away— Total Deployment by All German Human Beings— Horthy Removed— New German Offensive to Sweep Away Enemies in West— Speech at Ziegenberg, Reds Will Control Europe if We Lose

The Year 1945—Annihilation
Major Events in Summary
Report and Commentary
 Germany Betrayed— East Front Disaster— Radio Speech, Firm Will and Almighty Shall Save Germany— German Forces Collapse in Face of Invasion East and West— Decree Regarding Demolition in German Territory
 Eva Braun Comes to Bunker— Women in Hitler's Life— Death of Franklin Roosevelt— Final Days in Bunker Begin— Hitler Chooses Dönitz as Successor— Hitler's Marriage— Hitler's Last Testament— Suicide— Succession— Surrender

Epilogue
Hitler and History
Hitler and the Question of War Guilt
Hitler's Victories and Defeats in World War II
Hitler's Stays Abroad
Führer Headquarters
Ships Mentioned in the Text
Afterword
Notes
Bibliography
Notes from the American Editor
Documentary Works
Reference Works
General Works
Index

See also

List of Adolf Hitler books
List of Adolf Hitler speeches

References

External links
The speeches of Adolf Hitler: Problems in the documentary record: A World Future Fund study in documentary history.

1962 non-fiction books
History books about World War II
Books about Adolf Hitler
History books about Nazi Germany
Speeches by Adolf Hitler
20th-century history books